The 2023 Men's FINA Water Polo World Cup will be the 17th edition of the tournament. It will run from 8 March to 2 July 2023. The Super final will take place between 30 June and 2 July 2023 in Los Angeles, United States.

From this year on, the tournament will be replacing the FINA Water Polo World League.

Format
There will be two divisions. In Division 1, the top twelve teams from the World Championships will play. They will play all matches in March in Zagreb and Podgorica. All other teams can sign up in Division 2, in which each continent will host a qualification tournament. The top two teams from each of those tournaments will play in an intercontinental tournament. The top-six teams of Division 1 and the top-two teams from Division 2 will compete in the super final, held from 30 June to 2 July 2023. At the end of the tournament, the last-ranked team will be relegated to Division 2 and the winner of Division 2 will move to Division 1 for the following year. A win will give a team three points, a win after penalties two, a loss after penalites one and a loss after regular time zero points.

Division 1
The draw was held on 1 December 2022. Group A played their tournament in Zagreb, Croatia and Group B in Podgorica, Montenegro between 8 and 14 March 2023.

Group A

All times are local (UTC+1).

Group B

All times are local (UTC+1).

Division 2
The tournament will take place in Berlin, Germany between 1 and 7 May 2023.

Super final
The tournament will take place at the University of Southern California in Los Angeles, United States between 30 June and 2 July 2023.

Qualified teams

References

2023
2023 in water polo
FINA